Photon is a satellite bus based on Rocket Lab's kick stage.

Development 
In April 2019, Rocket Lab announced plans to create a new satellite bus, named Photon, to launch small payloads into Earth orbit. Its goal was to reduce the complexity and development time for customers, enabling technology demonstrations without the complexity of developing a full spacecraft. At the same time the company was aiming to broaden its portfolio and diversify its revenue streams. In October 2019, it announced that it aimed to launch its first mission as soon as the fourth quarter of 2020. The company also announced it was targeting lunar orbit as part of its services offered with Photon, enabled by a new bi-propellant propulsion system. The development of Photon included working with a number of potential customers, with significant interest from government agencies. The first few Photon satellites would be technology demonstrators before transitioning to operational launches for customers, which started with NASA's CAPSTONE cubesat in June 2022.

Rocket Lab's ultimate aim for Photon is that it will enable an interplanetary mission to Venus in 2023, delivering a laser-tunable mass spectrometer into the Venusian atmosphere.

Design 
Photon is manufactured at Rocket Lab's factory in Huntington Beach, California. It uses the Curie engine and communicates on S-band. The low Earth orbit version of Photon can take  to Sun-synchronous orbit.

A modified version of Photon has bigger propellant tanks and the HyperCurie engine for interplanetary missions. The interplanetary version has a  payload capacity. HyperCurie is an evolution of the Curie engine, which comes in a monopropellent version and a bipropellant version, while the HyperCurie is a hypergolic version. HyperCurie is electrically pumped.

Launch history 
The inaugural Photon satellite was the Photon Pathfinder/First Light satellite (COSPAR ID 2020-060A) described by Rocket Lab as its "first in-house designed and built Photon demonstration satellite". It was launched aboard Electron rocket on 31 August 2020 on the 14th Electron mission "I Can't Believe It's Not Optical". First Light had a dual role in the mission: first as the final rocket stage delivering the customer satellite (Capella 2) and then as a standalone satellite undertaking its own orbital mission. The purpose of First Light standalone mission is to demonstrate the new (as compared to "plain" kick stage) systems for operating in orbit as a long-duration standalone satellite. To demonstrate Photon bus' payload hosting, the First Light had a low-resolution video camera.

The second formal test, Photon Pathstone, was launched on 22 March 2021 on the 19th Electron mission "They Go Up So Fast".  Like First Light, Pathstone will first deliver customer satellites to orbit for transitioning into its own satellite operations. Pathstone operations are aimed at building flight heritage and focused on testing systems in preparation for launching NASA's CAPSTONE smallsat mission, later in 2021. These tests will include power and thermal management, attitude control via reaction wheels and communications systems.

The first operational launch for Photon was NASA's CAPSTONE smallsat mission. Qualification of the Photon kick stage for this mission was underway by December 2020. Photon delivered CAPSTONE on a trans-lunar injection (TLI) burn on 6th day from liftoff after performing 6 apogee raising burns at perigee within every 24 hours from liftoff, leading to TLI and a near-rectilinear halo orbit. After this the CAPSTONE was deployed in its journey to the Moon.

After completing all the mission requirements for NASA, Rocket Lab will utilise its Photon spacecraft for a low-altitude lunar flyby.

See also 
 Comparison of satellite buses

References 

Photon
Satellite buses